Fast and Feel Love is a 2022 Thai comedy film directed, written, and produced by Nawapol Thamrongrattanarit, starring Urassaya Sperbund and , released on Wednesday, April 6, 2022 (Chakri Memorial Day). 

The film is distributed by GDH.

Plot
Urassaya "Yaya" Sperbund plays J, a young woman caring for her boyfriend, Kao (played by Nat Kitcharit), who is competing to become the fastest cup stacking competitor in the world. After Kao is dumped by J, he has to learn basic adulting skills and try to win her back.

Cast
 Urassaya Sperbund as "Jay"
 Nat Kitcharit as "Kao"
 Anusara Korsamphan as "Metal" 
 Kanokwan Butrachart as "Kao's Mother"
 Wipawee Patnasiri as "Por"
 Keetapat Pongruea as "Pai-Liu"
 Lee Joo-hong as "Mr. Kang"
 Kim Chan-young as "Mr. Woo"
 Joshua Ugochukwu Ezunagu as "Edward"
 Marvelous Ndigwe as "Edward's Mother"
 Napak Tricharoendech as "Yam"

Production
On Sunday, October 24, 2021, the list of actors for Fast and Feel Love was announced and filming started. Director Nawapol Thamrongrattanarit stated the film would be somewhat more concise than his previous work. He wanted to portray the daily lives of people over the age of 30 through intimate stories, and chose sports stacking. This film officially ended filming on Sunday, December 26, 2021.

Many of the film's workshops were done on Zoom due to COVID-19 lockdowns. Sperbund said, "I listened a lot to rock band Imagine Dragons to help me get into my character."

Themes
A main theme of the film is the daily lives and challenges of people as they age out of their 20s and into their 30s.

Release
Fast and Feel Love was released on Wednesday, April 6, 2022 (Chakri Memorial Day) by GDH.

In July 2022, it was selected as opening film of the 21st New York Asian Film Festival, where it was screened at Walter Reade Theater, Film at Lincoln Center on July 15 for its international premiere. It was also invited to the 26th Fantasia International Film Festival and was screened for its Canadian premiere on July 18, 2022.

Reception and awards
Samuel Jamier, executive director of the New York Asian Film Festival (NYAFF), said the film is fast-moving with hilarious moments. He also remarked, "As the film says, sport stacking is genderless, ageless and border-free, which is a real game-changer."

Awards

References

External links
 
 

2022 films
GDH 559 films
Thai comedy films
Thai-language films